Topólka  is a village in Radziejów County, Kuyavian-Pomeranian Voivodeship, in north-central Poland. It is the seat of the gmina (administrative district) called Gmina Topólka.

The village has a population of 480.

References

Villages in Radziejów County
Pomeranian Voivodeship (1919–1939)